The Golden State is a nickname for the U.S. state of California.

Golden State or The Golden State may also refer to:

Music
 Golden State (band), indie rock band from Los Angeles
 Golden State (album), by Bush
 "Golden State" by American Hi-Fi, from the 2014 album Blood & Lemonade
 The Golden State (Mia Doi Todd album), 2002
 The Golden State (N2Deep album), 1997
 "The Golden State" by City and Colour, from the 2013 album The Hurry and the Harm"
 "Golden State" by Joywave, from the 2011 single "Golden State"

Sports
 Golden State Warriors, a National Basketball Association team
 Budweiser 400, at times known as the Golden State 400 (1963, 1971–1972), a former annual NASCAR Winston Cup race

Transportation
 Golden State (clipper), an 1853 clipper ship
 Golden State (schooner), a 1913 American sailing ship
 William F. Garms, a 1901 American sailing ship later renamed Golden State
 Golden State (train), a train that operated between Chicago and Los Angeles (1902–1968)
 California State Route 99, parts of which are also known as the Golden State Highway and Golden State Freeway

Other uses 
 Golden State (Disney California Adventure), former name of Grizzly Peak, part of a theme park
 Golden State Baptist College, in Santa Clara, California
 Golden State, a 2019 novel by Ben H. Winters 
 Golden State Killer, US serial killer and police officer from California